Étendard was one of 10 s built for the French Navy in the first decade of the 20th century.

During World War I, Étendard was torpedoed and sunk by an Imperial German Navy destroyer in the North Sea off Dunkirk, France, with the loss of all hands on 25 April 1917.

References

Bibliography

 

Branlebas-class destroyers
Ships built by Dyle et Bacalan
1908 ships
Maritime incidents in 1917
Ships lost with all hands
World War I shipwrecks in the North Sea